The Constitution of the Socialist Republic of Vietnam is the current constitution of Vietnam, adopted on 28 November 2013 by the Thirteenth National Assembly, and took effect on January 1, 2014. It is the fourth constitution adopted by the Vietnamese government since the political reunification of the country in 1976.

Current constitution
The current constitution, known as the 2013 Constitution, contains a preamble and 11 chapters:
Chapter I: Political System
Chapter II: Human Rights, Basic Civil Rights and Civic Duties
Chapter III: The Economy, Society, Culture, Education, Science, Technology, and the Environment
Chapter IV: Defence of the Homeland
Chapter V: The National Assembly
Chapter VI: President of the Republic
Chapter VII: The Government
Chapter VIII: The People's Court and the People's Procuracy
Chapter IX: Local Government
Chapter X: The National Electoral Council and the State Audit Office
Chapter XI: The Effect of the Constitution and Amending the Constitution

Previous constitutions
The Democratic Republic of Vietnam had two constitutions: 
1946 Constitution of the Democratic Republic of Vietnam, adopted on November 9, 1946.
1959 Constitution of the Democratic Republic of Vietnam, adopted on December 31, 1959.

Upon political reunification of the country in 1976, the 1960 Constitution of the Democratic Republic became the constitution of the Socialist Republic of Vietnam. Since then, the Vietnamese government adopted two constitutions before the 2013 Constitution:
1980 Constitution of the Socialist Republic of Vietnam, adopted on December 19, 1980.
1992 Constitution of the Socialist Republic of Vietnam, adopted on April 25, 1992, and amended in 2001.

The former Republic of Vietnam also had two constitutions, adopted in 1956 and 1967. Neither of these constitutional documents is in force, as the 1967 Constitution was abrogated when the government of the Republic of Vietnam collapsed in 1975.

1946 Constitution
The 1946 constitution adopted a semi-presidential system not so dissimilar from the French Constitution. The constitution allows multiple parties to participate in the elections along with oppositions.

The president of the republic according to the 1946 constitution which is an actual executive head, rather than the ceremonial position. The president also have significantly more power than the current post. The later 1959 constitution turned the president into a ceremonial head, while giving the de facto power to the party leader.

Despite the changes in later constitution, the current Vietnamese government still heavily praised it, calling it "one of the world's most democratic constitution at the time."

1959 Constitution
While the 1946 constitution was a superficially liberal democratic document, its 1959 successor was a fully Communist document. Its preamble defined the DRV as a "people's democratic state led by the working class," thus codifying the actual state of affairs that had prevailed since 1945. The document provided for a nominal separation of powers among legislative, executive, and judicial branches of government. On paper, the legislative function was carried out by the National Assembly. The assembly was empowered to make laws and to elect the chief officials of the state, such as the president (who was largely a symbolic head of state), the vice president, and cabinet ministers. Together those elected (including the president and vice president) formed a Council of Ministers, which constitutionally (but not in practice) was subject to supervision by the Standing Committee of the National Assembly. Headed by a prime minister, the council was the highest executive organ of state authority. Besides overseeing the Council of Ministers, the assembly's Standing Committee also supervised on paper the Supreme People's Court, the chief organ of the judiciary. The assembly's executive side nominally decided on national economic plans, approved state budgets, and acted on questions of war or peace. In reality, however, the final authority on all matters rested with the Political Bureau.

1980 Constitution
The 1980 Vietnam Constitution closely adhered to the USSR's 1977 Constitution, evident in the principle of dictatorship of the proletariat, the exclusive leadership of the Communist Party, the centrally planned economy, citizen's duties and statist rights, and the Leninist constitutional structure consisting of the supreme National Assembly, the collective presidency called Council of State, the subordinate government called Council of Ministers, the procuracies, and the courts.

The reunification of North and South Vietnam (the former Republic of Vietnam) in 1976 provided the primary motivation for revising the 1959 constitution. Revisions were made along the ideological lines set forth at the Fourth National Congress of the VCP in 1976, emphasizing popular sovereignty and promising success in undertaking "revolutions" in production, science and technology, culture, and ideology. In keeping with the underlying theme of a new beginning associated with reunification, the constitution also stressed the need to develop a new political system, a new economy, a new culture, and a new socialist person.

The 1959 document had been adopted during the tenure of Ho Chi Minh and demonstrated a certain independence from the Soviet model of state organization. The 1980 Constitution was drafted when Vietnam faced a serious threat from China, and political and economic dependence on the Soviet Union had increased. Perhaps, as a result, the completed document resembles the 1977 Soviet Constitution.

The 1980 Vietnamese Constitution concentrates power in a newly established Council of State much like the Presidium of the Supreme Soviet, endowing it nominally with both legislative and executive powers. Many functions of the legislature remain the same as under the 1959 document, but others have been transferred to the executive branch or assigned to both branches concurrently. The executive branch appears strengthened overall, having gained a second major executive body, the Council of State, and the importance of the National Assembly appears to have been reduced accordingly. The role of the Council of Ministers, while appearing on paper to have been subordinated to the new Council of State, in practice retained its former primacy.

Among the innovative features of the 1980 document is the concept of "collective mastery" of society, a frequently used expression attributed to the late party secretary, Le Duan (1907 - 1986). The concept is a Vietnamese version of popular sovereignty that advocates an active role for the people so that they may become their own masters as well as masters of society, nature, and the nation. It states that the people's collective mastery in all fields is assured by the state and is implemented by permitting the participation in state affairs of mass organizations. On paper, these organizations, to which almost all citizens belong, play an active role in government and have the right to introduce bills before the National Assembly.

Another feature is the concept of socialist legality, which dictates that "the state manage society according to law and constantly strengthen the socialist legal system." The concept, originally introduced at the Third National Party Congress in 1960, calls for achieving socialist legality through the state, its organizations, and its people. Law, in effect, is made subject to the decisions and directives of the party.

The 1980 Constitution comprises 147 articles in 12 chapters dealing with numerous subjects, including the basic rights and duties of citizens. Article 67 guarantees the citizens' rights to freedom of speech, the press, assembly, and association, and the freedom to demonstrate. These rights, however, were subject to a caveat stating that, "no one may misuse democratic freedoms to violate the interests of the state and the people." In practice, the party and the government had considerable latitude to determine what was in "the interests of the state and the people."

1992 Constitution 
In light of Doi Moi (market reforms adopted by Vietnam) beginning in 1986 and the collapse of the Eastern Bloc, Vietnam adopted a new Constitution in April 1992. The 1992 Constitution adopted a “socialist oriented market economy,” allowed the development of private economic sectors, but largely retained the previous Leninist constitutional structure.

References

Further reading

General reading and the 1992 Constitution and 2001 amendments 
Mark Sidel, The Constitution of Vietnam: A Contextual Analysis, Oxford: Hart Publishing, 2009.
Mark Sidel, Law and Society in Vietnam, Cambridge: Cambridge University Press, 2008.
To Van-Hoa, Judicial Independence, Lund: Jurisförlaget i Lund, 2006.
Mark Sidel, Analytical Models for Understanding Constitutions and Constitutional Dialogue in Socialist Transitional States: Re-Interpreting Constitutional Dialogue in Vietnam, 6 Singapore Journal of International and Comparative Law 42-89 (2002).
Pip Nicholson, Vietnamese Legal Institutions in Comparative Perspective: Constitutions and Courts Considered, in K Jayasuriya (ed.), Law, Capitalism and Power in Asia: The Rule of Law and Legal Institutions, London: Routledge, 1999.  
Russell H K Heng, The 1992 Revised Constitution of Vietnam: Background and Scope of Changes, 4:3 Contemporary Southeast Asia 221 (1992).

The 1980 Constitution 
Nguyen Phuong-Khanh, Introduction to the 1980 Constitution of the Socialist Republic of Vietnam, 7(3) Review of Socialist Law 347 (1981)(including the text of the 1980 Constitution).

The 1959 Constitution 
Bernard Fall, North Viet-Nam's New Draft Constitution, 32:2 Pacific Affairs 178 (1959).
Bernard Fall, North Viet-Nam's Constitution and Government, 33:3 Pacific Affairs 282 (1960).
Bernard Fall, Constitution-Writing in a Communist State – The New Constitution of North Vietnam, 6 Howard Law Journal 157 (1960).

External links

English language
2013 Constitution of the Socialist Republic of Vietnam 
 1992 Constitution of the Socialist Republic of Vietnam as amended 25 December 2001
1992 Constitution of the Socialist Republic of Vietnam as adopted in 1992 (without 2001 amendments)
 1959 Constitution of the Democratic Republic of Vietnam

Vietnamese language
 Resolution on amending and supplementing a number of articles of the Constitution of the Socialist Republic of Vietnam in 1992 (2001 constitutional amendments)
  Constitution of the Socialist Republic of Vietnam (1946, 1959, 1980 and 1992 constitutions)

Government of Vietnam
Vietnam

1992 in law
1992 in Vietnam